The molecular formula C18H22O5S (molar mass: 350.43 g/mol, exact mass: 350.1188 u) may refer to:

 Estropipate, or piperazine estrone sulfate
 Estrone sulfate, or estrone 3-sulfate